Abdul-Qadir Tariq Aziz Al-Rubaie (born 25 January 1994 in Baghdad, Iraq) is an Iraqi professional footballer who plays as a striker  for Iraqi Premier League club Al-Naft and for the Iraq national football team. His father, Tariq Aziz, and his older brother, Ziyad Tariq, are both Al-Shorta legends.

International debut
On December 25, 2014 Abdul Qadir Tariq made his International debut against Uzbekistan in a friendly match that ended 0–1 for Uzbekistan

International statistics

Iraq national under-23 team goals
Scores and results list Iraq's goal tally first.

References

External links

1994 births
Living people
Association football forwards
Iraqi footballers
Iraq international footballers
Place of birth missing (living people)
Al-Talaba SC players
Al-Shorta SC players